Bettahalasur is census town in Bangalore Urban district in the Indian state of Karnataka. Bettahalasur is located 25 km from Majestic Bus Terminal and 16 km from Bangalore International Airport.

Bettahalasur was known for stone quarrying but recently the quarrying activity has been stopped.

References

It has a railway Station attached to the village, TLS is the station code.

Villages in Bangalore Urban district